Beechwood is an unincorporated community located in the town of Scott, Sheboygan County, Wisconsin, United States.

Notable people
George W. Koch, Wisconsin State Representative, farmer, businessman, lived in Beechwood where he owned a cheese and butter factory.

Notes

Unincorporated communities in Sheboygan County, Wisconsin
Unincorporated communities in Wisconsin